LDC Watch is an alliance of organizations based in Least Developed Countries and other related organizations. Based in Belgium, it coordinates activities in the fields of trade, debt, foreign investment, human rights, governance and conflict resolution. LDC Watch undertakes lobbying, networking and advocacy with LDC governments and development agencies. Its aim is to implement a programme of action formulated at a UN Conference in Brussels in 2001, with the participation of civil society.

History
LDC Watch evolved out of the parallel NGO Forum at the Third UN Conference on the LDCs (UN LDC III) in Brussels in 2001, which adopted the Brussels Programme of Action (BPoA) for the LDCs for the Decade 2001–2010 (BPoA). The BPoA, based on 7 mutual commitments of the LDCs and their development partners, contains 30 international development goals, including those in the Millennium Declaration. The Fourth UN Conference on LDCs (LDC IV) in Turkey in 2011 was to assess the implementation of the BPoA, and marked the first decade of LDC Watch.

Functions
LDC Watch acts as a coordinating body for civil society in LDCs to advocate, campaign and network for the realization of the LDC Programme of Action (currently the BPoA) and other Internationally Agreed Development Goals (IADGs). It goes beyond the BPoA to address poverty, hunger, social injustices and human rights in the LDCs. LDC Watch, therefore, has been articulating civil society perspectives, engaging with the UN, LDC governments and their development partners, both as a partner and as a pressure group.

Major activities
LDC Watch has been engaging in the following activities in the past decade:
	Increase awareness on the BPoA including all other IADGs amongst the general public, CSOs and governments in LDCs, development partner governments and agencies, and relevant multi-lateral institutions.
	Promote increased attention and delivery of the specific requirements of the LDCs in global development processes.
	Enhance the awareness and capacity of LDC CSOs to effectively advocate, lobby, campaign and network for the implementation of the BPoA including all other IADGs.
	Engage with the UN, LDC governments, development partner governments and agencies, relevant multi-lateral institutions, political parties including parliamentarians, media and civil society on LDC-related issues and concerns.
	Organize multi-stakeholder consultations in the LDCs aiming to assess the implementation of the BPoA and other IADGs in national development contexts and processes.
	Organize national, regional and global CSO consultations for discussion and strategy-building aiming to develop enhanced LDC-oriented global development processes, by promoting a pro-poor development agenda in favour of the vulnerable and marginalized in the LDCs.
	Organize parliamentary hearings on the issues and concerns of the LDCs both with national governments as well as development partner governments.
	Build up a CSO network, both as partner and pressure group, to seek the political will of all stakeholders for the implementation of global development commitments.
	Research on pro-poor agendas with focus on the key issues of debt, trade, food sovereignty, livelihoods, governance, aid and gender justice, and produce reports reflecting civil society perspectives on the implementation of the IADGs.
	Mobilize political will of all development stakeholders towards building a pro-poor, next Programme of Action for LDCs at the LDC IV in Turkey in 2011.
	Co-ordinate the civil society process towards the LDC IV that will culminate with the organisation of the Civil Society Forum to be held in parallel with it in Turkey in 2011.

BPoA and UN LDC-IV
The BPoA regards its success as dependent on effective follow-up, implementation, monitoring and review at the national, regional and global levels. In its resolution 63/227 of 2008, the UN General Assembly decided to convene the LDC IV that will assess the implementation of the BPoA, reaffirm the global commitment for LDCs and subsequently adopt the next-generation Programme of Action for LDCs. Preparations for LDC IV are underway at national, regional and global levels with a calendar of pre-conference events and two inter-governmental preparatory committee meetings that will be held ahead of the conference in 2011. The preparatory process and the conference itself will consist of an inter-governmental track, parliamentary track, international organisations track, civil society track and a private sector track.

In the context of the civil society track, on 19–20 October 2010 at the UN Headquarters, the international steering committee of the civil society process was officially launched by Cheick Sidi Diarra, Under-Secretary-General and High Representative of UN-OHRLLS, and the Secretary-General of UN LDC IV. LDC Watch, entrusted by UN-OHRLLS with globally coordinating the civil society preparations towards and at the LDC IV, will be leading the Civil Society Steering Committee to Istanbul. The civil society process will culminate at the Civil Society Forum to be held in parallel with LDC IV in Turkey in 2011.

Steering committee
LDC Watch is managed by a steering committee comprising members from LDC CSOs in Nepal, Cambodia, Senegal, Ethiopia, and Belgium, representing development partner country CSOs. The alliance is coordinated by an international secretariat with support from the European Co-ordination Office and three regional focal points.
The international secretariat is hosted by Rural Reconstruction Nepal (RRN) in Kathmandu, Nepal while the European Co-ordination Office is housed in Eurostep in Brussels, Belgium.

References

External links
 LDC Watch website

International development agencies
International organisations based in Nepal